Espah (also Romanized as Espeh) is a village in Kahnuk Rural District, Irandegan District, Khash County, Sistan and Baluchestan Province, Iran. At the 2006 census, its population was 587, in 123 families.

References 

Populated places in Khash County